Kleis Bozhanaj (born 1 March 2001) is an Albanian professional footballer who plays as a midfielder or forward for  Carrarese on loan from  Modena.

Career
As a youth player, Bozhanaj joined the youth academy of Italian Serie A side Empoli. Before the second half of 2019–20, he was sent on loan to the youth academy of Napoli in the Italian Serie A. In 2021, he was sent on loan to Portuguese second division club Casa Pia from Spezia in the Italian Serie A. On 10 October 2021, Bozhanaj debuted for Casa Pia during a 1–1 draw with Mafra.

On 13 July 2022, Bozhanaj moved on loan to Carrarese. On 5 January 2023, the transfer was made permanent. On 25 January 2023, he signed for Serie B club Modena on a permanent deal, before returning on loan to Carrarese until the end of the season.

References

External links
 
 

Albanian footballers
Living people
2001 births
Association football midfielders
Association football forwards
Spezia Calcio players
Casa Pia A.C. players
Carrarese Calcio players
Modena F.C. 2018 players
Albanian expatriate footballers
Liga Portugal 2 players
Expatriate footballers in Italy
Albanian expatriate sportspeople in Italy
Expatriate footballers in Portugal
Albanian expatriate sportspeople in Portugal